Iswari Prasad Upadhyaya (1888 - 1986) was an Indian historian. He was an alumnus of Aligarh Muslim University, and very first graduate of the university. He dealt mainly with the Muslim rulers and governments of India, especially with the Mughal and Tughluq dynasties. He did extensive work on rulers such as Muhammad bin Tughluq, the Sultan of Delhi, Humayun, and Aurangzeb.

He was born in Agra, Uttar Pradesh in a village called Kurra Chittarpur. His father Lt. Shobharam Upadhyay was head-master in a school. His father's untimely death left a very young Ishwari Prasad, a student of class 12th to look after his younger siblings.

He continued his education and earned his livelihood by giving tuitions. He was a student of Agra College and while he was studying in M.A.,he was taking B.A. classes. During one of his lectures Prof. Rushbrook Williams was present & he believed that Dr. Ishwari Prasad possessed unusual qualifications as a Historian. He invited him to teach at the University of Allahabad.He was elected Member of Legislative Council from the graduate constituency for 3 terms continuously. Contributions to historical research and scholarship.

He was conferred Padma Bhushan in 1984 by the President of India for his contributions to History.

Works 

 History of medieval India from 647 AD to the Mughal conquest. Allahabad : The Indian press, ltd., 1925 
 The Mughal Empire. Allahabad: Chugh Publications, 1974 
 A Short History of Muslim Rule in India, from the Conquest of Islam to the Death of Aurangzeb: From the Advent of Islam to the Death of Aurangzeb. Allahabad: The Indian press, Ltd., 1965  
 A History of the Qaraunah Turks in India. Allahabad: The Indian press, ltd., 1936  
 The life and times of Humayun. Bombay [ua] : Orient Longmans, 1956 
 India in the eighteenth century. Allahabad: Chugh Publications, 1973 
 Hindu - Muslim problems. Allahabad: Chugh Publications, 1974 
 L'Inde du 7e au 16e siècle. Traduit sur la 2e edition par H. de Saugy. Paris : de Boccard, 1930 (Histoire du monde ; 8,1) 
 The life and times of Maharaja Juddha Shumsher Jung Bahadur Rana of Nepal. New Delhi : Ashish Pub. House, 1975 
 History of mediaeval India. Allahabad: The Indian press, ltd., 1976 
 History of Indian Timurids. 1 ed. Allahabad : The Indian press, ltd., 1995
 A New History of India. Allahabad : The Indian press, ltd., 1940

References

External links 

 Aligarh Muslim University http://www.amu.ac.in,

Historians of South Asia
20th-century Indian historians
Aligarh Muslim University alumni
Recipients of the Padma Bhushan in literature & education
1888 births
1986 deaths